This is a list of members of the fourth Gauteng Provincial Legislature as elected in the election of 22 April 2009. In that election, the African National Congress (ANC) retained its majority in the legislature, winning 47 of 73 seats. The Democratic Alliance (DA) served as the official opposition with 16 seats, and five other parties – the Congress of the People (COPE), the Freedom Front Plus (FF+), the Inkatha Freedom Party (IFP), the African Christian Democratic Party (ACDP), and the Independent Democrats (ID) – were also represented.

During its first sitting on 6 May 2009, the legislature elected Nomvula Mokonyane as the fifth Premier of Gauteng. It also elected Lindiwe Maseko to serve as the province's first female Speaker. Maseko was deputised by Steward Ngwenya and, from August 2012, by Uhuru Moiloa.

Composition 

|-style="background:#e9e9e9;"
!colspan="2" style="text-align:left"| Party !! style="text-align:center"| Seats 
|-
|  || 47 
|-
|  || 16 
|-
|  || 6 
|-
|  || 1 
|-
|  || 1
|-
|  || 1 
|-
|  || 1 
|-
|colspan="2" style="text-align:left"| Total || style="text-align:right"| 73 
|}

Members 
This is a list of members of the fourth legislature as elected in April 2009. The list does not take into account changes in membership after the election.

References 

Legislature